Carrignafoy is a townland on the Great Island in Cork Harbour, Ireland. It extends from the peripheries of Cobh town centre to the countryside areas which lead into Cuskinny and Ballymore. It contains a number of housing estates, and five schools are located in this area. A leisure centre was opened in 2006 on the site of the old swimming pool in Carrignafoy.

The area includes 'Top of the Hill', a hillside area close to Cobh town centre, which is a centre for commercial and leisure activities in Cobh.

See also 
 List of townlands of the Barony of Barrymore

References

External links
Views of the harbour from Carrignafoy
Aura Cobh Leisure Centre Carrignafoy

Townlands of County Cork
Cobh